Zoran Ćirić (born 27 June 1973) is a Serbian football manager and former player.

Playing career
After spending three seasons at Bečej, Ćirić was signed by Partizan in the summer of 1997. He later played professionally in Cyprus and Greece.

Managerial career
After hanging up his boots, Ćirić served as manager of Tekstilac Odžaci on several occasions. He was also manager of Bačka 1901.

References

External links
 
 

1973 births
Living people
Serbia and Montenegro footballers
Serbian footballers
Association football forwards
OFK Bečej 1918 players
FK Partizan players
Anorthosis Famagusta F.C. players
Apollon Smyrnis F.C. players
FK Mladost Apatin players
FK ČSK Čelarevo players
First League of Serbia and Montenegro players
Cypriot First Division players
Super League Greece players
Second League of Serbia and Montenegro players
Serbia and Montenegro expatriate footballers
Expatriate footballers in Cyprus
Expatriate footballers in Greece
Serbia and Montenegro expatriate sportspeople in Cyprus
Serbia and Montenegro expatriate sportspeople in Greece
Serbian football managers
FK Bačka 1901 managers